Guo Dongling (born 13 December 1973) is a Chinese cross-country skier. She competed in three events at the 1998 Winter Olympics.

References

External links
 

1973 births
Living people
Chinese female cross-country skiers
Olympic cross-country skiers of China
Cross-country skiers at the 1998 Winter Olympics
Skiers from Heilongjiang
Asian Games medalists in cross-country skiing
Cross-country skiers at the 1996 Asian Winter Games
Cross-country skiers at the 1999 Asian Winter Games
Asian Games gold medalists for China
Asian Games bronze medalists for China
Medalists at the 1996 Asian Winter Games
Medalists at the 1999 Asian Winter Games
20th-century Chinese women